Aseyev (masculine) or Aseyeva (feminine) is a Russian last name, a variant of Yevseyev. It is shared by the following people:
Anastasia Aseyeva, member of the ballet troupe at the Donetsk State Academic Opera and Ballet Theatre named after A. Solovyanenko
Herman Aseyev, member of the parliament of Ukraine in 1990–1994
Igor Aseyev, Hero of the Soviet Union who fought with Roza Shanina, a Soviet sniper
Konstantin Aseev (Aseyev) (1960–2004), Russian chess grandmaster
Lyudmila Aseyeva, one of the names of Lyudmila Gromova (b. 1942), Soviet Olympic artistic gymnast
Nadezhna Aseyeva, Russian speed skater who participated in the 2014 World Sprint Speed Skating Championships
Nikolai Aseev (Nikolay Aseyev) (1889–1963), Russian poet
Stanislav Aseyev (b. 1989), Ukrainian writer and journalist. 
Tetyana Aseeva (Aseyeva), referee at the UEFA Women's Euro 2009 qualifying
Vladimir Aseev (Aseyev) (b. 1951), Russian politician

References

Notes

Sources
И. М. Ганжина (I. M. Ganzhina). "Словарь современных русских фамилий" (Dictionary of Modern Russian Last Names). Москва, 2001. 



Russian-language surnames